Zhang Zheng (born September 1969) is a People's Liberation Army Navy officer who served as captain of Chinese aircraft carrier Liaoning from September 2012 to May 2016.

Zhang is a member of the Communist Party of China.

Biography
Zhang was born into a military family in Changxing County, Zhejiang, in September 1969. His father is a former naval officer in the East Sea Fleet. He attended the First High School of Dinghai. In 1986, he was accepted to Shanghai Jiao Tong University, majoring in automatic-control. After college, he was assigned to the Command of East Sea Fleet as an assistant engineer. In 1992, he entered Dalian Naval Academy, majoring in warship combat command, he earned a master's degree in 1995. After graduation, he worked in 91991 Army, and served various roles in there, including Staff officer, XO, and CO. He then studied at Joint Services Command and Staff College in the United Kingdom for two years. He returned to China in 2003 and was awarded the rank of commodore. In September 2012 he was appointed the Captain of Chinese aircraft carrier Liaoning, and held that position until May 2016, when he was promoted to Assistant Deputy Chief of Staff of the People's Liberation Army Navy (PLA Navy).

References

1969 births
People from Huzhou
Living people
Shanghai Jiao Tong University alumni
Dalian Naval Academy alumni
Graduates of Joint Services Command and Staff College
People's Liberation Army Navy personnel